Sherry Kindo Kamara (born 11 March 1994 in Valkenswaard) is a Dutch professional footballer who played as a forward for Eerste Divisie club FC Eindhoven during the 2011–12 season.

References

External links
 

Living people
1994 births
People from Valkenswaard
Dutch footballers
Association football forwards
FC Eindhoven players
Eerste Divisie players
Footballers from North Brabant